Heini Brüggemann was a German sprint canoeist who competed in the late 1930s. He won a gold medal in the K-4 1000 m event at the 1938 ICF Canoe Sprint World Championships in Vaxholm.

External links

German male canoeists
Possibly living people
Year of birth missing
ICF Canoe Sprint World Championships medalists in kayak